Trevor John Gadd (born 1952) is a retired English track cycling champion who represented Great Britain and England.

Cycling career

Olympic Games
Gadd represented Great Britain at the 1976 Summer Olympics where he finished in 12th place in the men's sprint.

Commonwealth Games
He represented England and won two silver medals in the tandem and the 1,000 metres match sprint, at the 1978 Commonwealth Games in Edmonton, Alberta, Canada.

World Championships
He competed in the 1977 UCI Track Cycling World Championships in Venezuela.

National Championships
Gadd won six British National Track Championships; three in 1977 and three in 1978.

Other
 1977 British White Hope winner, Herne Hill, London, 5th in the 1Km time trial.  
 1978 European Indoor Championships East Berlin, 2nd in sprint.
 1978 Winner, Champion of Champions Sprint event in Herne Hill, London (first British rider to win in 20 years).
 1987 Canadian National Championships; sprint silver and 1.000 metres time trial.

References

External links
 http://www.gbrathletics.com/commonwealth/cycling.htm
 http://www.londonfgss.com/thread16620.html

1952 births
Living people
English male cyclists
People from Wolverhampton
Olympic cyclists of Great Britain
Cyclists at the 1976 Summer Olympics
Commonwealth Games medallists in cycling
Commonwealth Games silver medallists for England
Cyclists at the 1978 Commonwealth Games
Medallists at the 1978 Commonwealth Games